Green Route is a segment along the Bangalore and Mangalore railway line in India, within the Western Ghat mountain ranges.	

This is the railway track from Sakaleshpura (altitude 906 m MSL) to the Kukke Subramanya (altitude 120 m MSL) Road station.  It is 52 km long, with around 57 tunnels and 109 bridges of length varying from few metres to 0.75 km and height varying from a few to 200 metres.  The tunnels are absolute terrestrial abyss.

Gallery

External links 
 http://www.hmrdc.com/location/

Hiking trails in India